Szelment  is a settlement in the administrative district of Gmina Szypliszki, within Suwałki County, Podlaskie Voivodeship, in north-eastern Poland, close to the border with Lithuania. Szelment is located 15 km north of Suwałki. It is also home to a 1000m cable car line, the second-longest in Poland. It is located 6.0 km from the nearest city in Lithuania, Salaperaugis.

References

Szelment